The 2009 All-Ireland Minor Camogie Championship is a competition for age graded development squad county teams in the women's team field sport of camogie was won by Kilkenny, who defeated Clare by eight points in the final, played at Semple Stadium Thurles. 2009 Kilkenny 5-10 Clare 3-8.

B Division
The Minor B final was won by Limerick who defeated Waterford by one point in a dramatic final at Mallow. Waterford defeated Derry 1–9 to 0–9 at Ashbourne and Limerick defeated Wexford 3–16 to 3–9 in the semi-finals. Naomi Carroll and Chloe Morey scored three points each. The Minor C final was won by Laois. Sarah Ann Fitzgerald scored 2–2 to help Laois defeat Carlow in the final by five points. Laois defeated Roscommon in the minor C semi-final  by 8–12 to 1–1 and Carlow defeated Cavan.

Arrangements
Clare defeated Cork 1–9 to 0–11 in the semi-final at Kilmallock, while ’s Denise Gaule scored 3–7 and Aoife Murphy 2–3 as Kilkenny defeated Tipperary by 5–15 to 3–4.

The Final
Five goals before half-time, two of them from Denise Gaule, enabled Kilkenny win the final. They lead 5.05 to 1.04 at the break

Final stages

References

External links
 Camogie Association

Minor
All-Ireland Minor Camogie Championship